"Waves" is a song by Dutch singer and rapper Mr. Probz. The song became an international hit upon being remixed in a more up-tempo fashion by German DJ and record producer Robin Schulz, with Schulz's remix topping the charts in multiple countries, including Austria, Sweden, and the United Kingdom. "Waves" was sent to US dance radio by Ultra Music on 14 April 2014. The remix was the fourth best-selling song of 2014 in the UK, selling over 800,000 copies.

Robin Schulz remix

German DJ and record producer Robin Schulz remixed the song in a more up-tempo fashion, with the remix being released as a single on 4 February 2014 in North America and 7 February in Europe. The remix propelled the song to greater success, topping the charts in Austria, Germany, Norway, Sweden, Switzerland and the United Kingdom, and peaking within the top five of the charts in Denmark, Finland, Hungary, Ireland and Italy.

An alternate version of the Schulz remix was released on November 11, 2014, featuring additional vocals from American rapper T.I. and American singer Chris Brown. This version is featured on the Ultra Music compilation album Ultra Dance 16.

Chart performance
On 27 April 2014, "Waves" debuted at number one on the UK Singles Chart, selling 127,000 copies in its first week, and then remained there the following week. The song also peaked at number one in Austria, Germany, Norway, Sweden and Switzerland. In the United States, the remix reached number one on the Billboard Dance/Mix Show Airplay chart for the issue dated 16 August 2014. "Waves" also topped the UK's Official Audio Streaming Chart for eight consecutive weeks and ended 2014 as both the UK's fourth most streamed track and fourth best-seller, with 32.1 million streams and selling 815,000 copies.

Music video
The music video for the remix of "Waves" was shot in Tulum, Mexico and released on 3 February 2014; another identical version was uploaded by Ultra Music the following day. Belarusian model Maryna Linchuk and British model James Penfold star in the video as a couple, with Mr. Probz in a cameo in a bar. The video begins with Penfold swimming towards a desert island. After reaching the shore and knocking some coconuts down from a tree, he recounts a time when he and his girlfriend were on holiday together. They are shown to get on very well at first, but then have several arguments, and this culminates in them breaking up one evening. The scene switches to Penfold sitting in a Jacuzzi and drinking several shots of vodka, revealing that the desert island never existed and was only in his mind. He then collapses back-first into the Jacuzzi and drowns. The video ends with Penfold lying dead in the middle of the ocean. The video has over 500 million views as of June 2022.

Track listings
Digital download
 "Waves" – 2:54

Digital download (remix)
 "Waves" (Robin Schulz radio edit) – 3:28

Digital download (remix)
 "Waves" (Robin Schulz radio edit)  – 3:10

CD single
 "Waves" (Robin Schulz radio edit) – 3:28
 "Waves" (original edit) – 2:54

Charts

Original version

Weekly charts

Year-end charts

Robin Schulz remix

Weekly charts

Year-end charts

Decade-end charts

Certifications and sales

Release history

References

2013 songs
2013 singles
2014 singles
Mr Probz songs
Epic Records singles
Ultra Music singles
Number-one singles in Austria
Number-one singles in Germany
Number-one singles in Greece
Number-one singles in Hungary
Number-one singles in Norway
Number-one singles in Poland
Number-one singles in Scotland
Number-one singles in Sweden
Number-one singles in Switzerland
UK Singles Chart number-one singles
Tropical house songs